Buin Rural District is a rural district (dehestan) in Nanur District, Baneh County, Kurdistan Province, Iran. At the 2006 census, its population was 5,172, in 905 families. The rural district has 30 villages.

References 

Rural Districts of Kurdistan Province
Baneh County